Joey Dawson (born 30 May 2003) is an English professional footballer who plays for Scottish Premiership side Celtic. He can play as a midfielder or forward.

Playing career

Scunthorpe United
Born in Scunthorpe, Dawson joined the Scunthorpe United Academy at under-8 level and began a two-year scholarship in May 2019. He made his first-team debut on 13 August 2019, aged just 16 years and 75 days old, to become the youngest player in the club's history. The game was a 1–0 defeat to Derby County in the first round of the EFL Cup at Glanford Park, he came on as a 74th-minute substitute for John McAtee. Two months later he was reportedly being tracked by Arsenal.

Dawson made no more competitive first-team appearances for Scunthorpe, but did continue to play regularly in their u18 team. His goal in a 3–2 win over Mansfield Town was one of 10 nominees for October 2020 goal of the month. By April 2021, he had scored 16 goals for the youth team during the season, and Derby County and Celtic were now being reported as interested in signing him.

Celtic
Dawson signed a three-year contract with Celtic in June 2021. He made his debut on Boxing Day 2021 against St Johnstone.

Style of play
Dawson is a versatile player who can play as a midfielder or forward.

Honours

Celtic

Scottish Premiership: 2021–22

Personal life
Dawson's father, Andy Dawson, is a former player, caretaker-manager and first-team coach at Scunthorpe United. His uncle, Michael Dawson, is a former Premier League player and England international. Another uncle, Kevin Dawson, played for Nottingham Forest and Chesterfield.

Statistics

References

2003 births
Living people
People from Scunthorpe
English footballers
Association football midfielders
Association football forwards
Scunthorpe United F.C. players
English Football League players
Celtic F.C. players
Lowland Football League players